Ana Bedran-Russo (née Ana Karina Bedran de Castro) is Professor in Restorative Dentistry and Chair of the Department of General Dental Sciences in restorative dentistry at the Marquette University School of Dentistry.

Bedran-Russo previously taught at the University of Campinas's Piracicaba School of Dentistry in Brazil, the University of North Carolina at Chapel Hill and the University of Illinois at Chicago College of Dentistry.

As a clinician-scientist, she holds many research grants from federal, institutional and association sources. She has over 130 scientific peer reviewed paper and over 170 abstracts. She has served many leadership roles in professional associations including the International Association for Dental Research and the American Dental Association. She has received achievements awards, including the 2014 UIC Researcher of the Year award and the 2021 Way Klingler Research Award. She is a 2018 alumni of the Hedwig van Ameringen Executive Leadership in Academic Medicine (ELAM) program.

She is expanding the research of biomaterials and tooth-restoration interfaces using biomimetics and tissue engineering. Her work is focused on tooth properties and the improvement or development of new restorative materials. Bedran-Russo's research regarding the biomodification of dentin using bioactive agents has potential impact to introduce novel bioinspired dental therapies to prevent caries and to develop long lasting tooth colored restorations.

Originally from Brazil, Bedran-Russo earned her DDS at the Araçatuba School of Dentistry in São Paulo; her MS in operative dentistry/clinical sciences at Piracicaba; and her PhD in dental material sciences at Piracicaba. She came to the United States in 2001 as a visiting research scholar to develop research in biomaterials at University of North Carolina. Her husband, Stephen Russo, is a periodontist.

External links
 Faculty page at University of Illinois at Chicago College of Dentistry

Living people
Year of birth missing (living people)
Women dentists
Brazilian emigrants to the United States
University of Illinois Chicago faculty
University of North Carolina at Chapel Hill faculty